Survival of the Fittest is the debut album by jazz/funk quintet the Headhunters, released in 1975 on Arista Records. It features the stand out track "God Make Me Funky", in which its drum break has been sampled numerous times by prominent rappers. The album was re-issued on compact disc by BMG France in 2001, which was digitally remastered from the original master tapes in 24-bit by Jean-Pierre Chalbos.

Track listing
All songs by Bennie Maupin, Bill Summers, Paul Jackson, Mike Clark and Blackbird McKnight.

Personnel
 Blackbyrd McKnight - electric guitar, vocals
 Bennie Maupin - saxophones, vocals, saxello, clarinets, flutes, lyricon, piano
 Paul Jackson - bass guitar, vocals
 Mike Clark - drums, vocals
 Bill Summers - percussion, vocals
 Joyce Jackson - alto flute
 Zak Diouf, Baba Duru Oshun and Harvey Mason, Sr. - percussion
 Pointer Sisters - vocals

Sampling
Recordings which have sampled "God Make Me Funky" and other tracks off the album include:
"God Make Me Funky"
Biz Markie on "Albee Square Mall" (Goin' Off, 1988)
N.W.A on "Gangsta Gangsta" (Straight Outta Compton, 1988)
DJ Jazzy Jeff & The Fresh Prince on "As We Go" (He's the DJ, I'm the Rapper, 1988)
Eric B. & Rakim on "To the Listeners" and "Beats for the Listeners" (Follow The Leader, 1988) 
J. J. Fad on "Let's Get Hyped" (Supersonic, 1988)
De La Soul on "Take It Off" (3 Feet High and Rising, 1989) and "Pease Porridge" ("De La Soul is Dead", 1991)
N.W.A on "Sa Prize, Pt. 2" (100 Miles and Runnin' EP, 1990)
N.W.A on "Approach to Danger" (Niggaz4Life, 1991)
Prince and the New Power Generation on "To Whom It May Concern" (My Name Is Prince, 1992)
Digable Planets on "Pacifics" (Reachin' (A New Refutation of Time and Space), 1993) and "Dog It" (Blowout Comb, 1994)
Usher on "U-Turn" (8701, 2001)
Nas on "Hip Hop Is Dead feat. will.i.am" (Hip Hop Is Dead, 2006)
DMX on "How's It Goin' Down" feat. Faith Evans (It's Dark and Hell Is Hot, 1998)
"If You've Got It, You'll Get It"
Mellow Man Ace on "Talkapella" (Escape from Havana, 1989)
Boogie Down Productions on "Ruff Ruff" (Sex and Violence, 1992)
"Mugic"
O.S.T.R. on "Outrostan" (Outro)" (Jazz, dwa, trzy, 2011)

References

External links
 The Headhunters - Survival-Of-The-Fittest at Discogs

1975 debut albums
The Headhunters albums
Albums produced by Dave Rubinson
Arista Records albums
Albums recorded at Wally Heider Studios